The  is a free independent Japanese weekly newspaper which focuses on news and life in the New York tri-state area and across the United States. With a base in New York, New Jersey, and Connecticut, and delivered along with major Japanese dailies, the Asahi Shimbun and the Nikkei, in Westchester, New Jersey, Ohio, and Washington, D.C., the Shukan NY Seikatsu has an expanding circulation. The paper is also available in 250 locations in Japan, such as the Tokyo Ōte-machi branch of Books Kinokuniya. 

Seeking to expand its circulation, in 2013, the paper added an English section, which is primarily a translation of select articles from the previous week's edition.

See also
Japanese in New York City

External links

Japanese-language newspapers published in the United States
Weekly newspapers published in the United States
Newspapers published in New York City